Lurtotecan is a semi-synthetic analog of camptothecin with antineoplastic activity. Liposomal lurtotecan was in clinical trials as a treatment for topotecan-resistant ovarian cancer, but was discontinued.

Synthesis

 Heck reaction
 Mitsunobu reaction
 Potassium osmate
 Sharpless asymmetric dihydroxylation
 Swern oxidation

References

Antineoplastic drugs
Piperazines
Topoisomerase inhibitors
Delta-lactones